James K. Pettapiece (May 7, 1937 – December 19, 2016) was a Canadian curler. He was the second on the Don Duguid rink that won two Curling Championships and two Brier Championships in 1970 and 1971. Pettapiece also played in the 1973 Macdonald Brier playing second for the Danny Fink rink, finishing with a 4–6 record. He was inducted into the Canadian Curling Hall of Fame in 1974, and into the Manitoba Sports Hall of Fame in 1981. He died in Vancouver in 2016 following a two-month struggle with cancer.

References

External links
 

1937 births
2016 deaths
Curlers from Manitoba
Brier champions
World curling champions
Canadian male curlers
Deaths from cancer in British Columbia